The  is a diesel multiple unit (DMU) train type operated  by West Japan Railway Company (JR-West) on Hamakaze limited express services between  and  since November 2010 and Biwako Express services between Osaka and  since March 2014.

Operations
 Hamakaze (from November 2010)
 Biwako Express (from March 2014)

Formation
Trains are formed as 3-car sets, as shown below.

Interior
The trains are all standard-class, with a total seating capacity of 156 passengers per 3-car set. Seating is in standard 2+2 abreast configuration with a seat pitch of 970 mm, an increase of 60 mm compared with the earlier KiHa 181 series trains.

History
The first three-car set was delivered from Niigata Transys to Fukui Depot on 19 March 2010, with test running commencing on 23 March.

The trains entered revenue service from 7 November 2010.

In October 2022, JR-West announced plans to remodel a KiHa 189 series set into a sightseeing train. The renovated train, designed by Yasuyuki Kawanishi, is scheduled to commence operation in late 2024.

References

External links

 JR-West KiHa 189 series (Japan Railfan Magazine Online) 

189 series
West Japan Railway Company
Niigata Transys rolling stock
Train-related introductions in 2010